The Françoise river is a tributary of the rivière aux Anglais flowing in the unorganized territory Rivière-aux-Outardes, in the Manicouagan Regional County Municipality, in the administrative region of Côte-Nord, in the province of Quebec, in Canada.

The Françoise river valley is mainly served by the English river path.

The surface of the Françoise river is generally frozen from the beginning of December to the end of March, except the rapids areas; however, safe circulation on the ice is generally from mid-December to mid-March.

Geography 
The Françoise river has its source on the Canadian Shield, at a small unidentified lake.

  southerly in a straight line, crossing an unidentified lake on its full length, to its mouth;
  to the south relatively in a straight line in a deep valley, crossing a small lake in mid-segment, collecting on the west side the discharge from a lake, then collecting on the east side two discharges from lakes, up to a bend in the river, corresponding to the discharge (coming from the east) of three lakes;
  towards the east relatively in a straight line in a deep valley, until its mouth.

The Françoise river flows on the northeast bank of the upper course of the rivière aux Anglais, in the unorganized territory of Rivière-aux-Outardes. This confluence is located downstream from Lake Pascal and downstream from the confluence of the Tremblay River.

Toponym 
The term "Françoise" is a first name of French origin.

The toponym "Françoise River" was formalized on August 2, 1974, at the Place Names Bank of the Commission de toponymie du Québec.

See also 

 List of rivers of Quebec

References

External links 
 

Rivers of Côte-Nord
Manicouagan Regional County Municipality